Adisadel College, popularly known as "ADISCO", is an Anglican boys' boarding school in Cape Coast, Ghana. Adisadel College is one of the oldest senior high schools in Africa, and was ranked 10th out of the top 100 best high schools in Africa by Africa Almanac in 2003, based on quality of education, student engagement, strength and activities of alumni, school profile, internet and news visibility.

History
Adisadel was established in 1910 in a building at Topp Yard, near Christ Church School which is within the vicinity of Cape Coast Castle. It began with 29 boys, but by 1935, it had expanded to accommodate about 200 pupils. The school buildings were extended in 1950 by Maxwell Fry and Jane Drew. Student enrolment stood at 545, at the time of the school's Golden Jubilee in 1960. There were over 1500 boarding students and 93 teachers when the school celebrated its centenary anniversary in 2010.

The school's original founder was the Rt. Rev. Nathaniel Temple Hamlyn, a missionary who was then Anglican Bishop of Accra between 1908 and 1910. Hamlyn's ambition was to establish a grammar school to educate the sons of Anglicans in the colony, and also create an educational institution which will serve as a training ground for the clergy.

Adisadel College is the second-oldest secondary school in Ghana after Mfantsipim School, an arch rival which was established by the Methodist Church in 1876. Adisco is also one of the most famous institutions of learning in sub-Saharan Africa.

Uniform

The school uniform is black and white striped shirt and black shorts, which directly reflects the primary colours of the college. The distinctive colour combination is colloquially referred to as "zebra", due to its semblance to the stripes of that animal species. Unsurprisingly, the distinctive outfit has earned Adisco students the nickname of "zebra boys". Prior to the introduction of this style of uniform in the 1990s, students of the old Form One to Form Five stream wore blue shirts and brown khaki shorts, whiles those in Sixth Form wore white shirts and brown shorts. Adisadel College was the first secondary school in the history of Ghana to design special cloaks for its prefects: red for the head prefect, blue for the other prefects, and green for the assistants. That tradition still persists till this day.

Headmasters of Adisadel College

Publications
Adisadel On The Hill: The History (1910–2010) - by John Samuel Pobee, Vicar General of the Anglican Diocese of Accra. This book was published and launched in March 2010 to coincide with the school's centenary anniversary.
The Owl is a monthly newsletter for students and alumni of Adisadel College.
Reminiscences of Adisadel - A short historical sketch of ADISADEL COLLEGE published in 1980, by G. McLean Amissah.

Publication: Reminiscences Of Adisadel College 1970-1975 Editors: Dr Paul Mensah; Dr Kwesi Bentum Date: 2017  Publisher: Buck Press Ltd, Accra, Ghana.

Notable alumni
   

 
Head of State: Akwasi Amankwa Afrifa  
 Scientists: Ave Kludze, Thomas Mensah, Nii Quaynor
Speakers of Parliament: Rt.Hon Jacob Hackenburg Griffiths-Randolph, Rt.Hon Ebenezer Sekyi-Hughes  
Chief Justices: Justice George Kingsley Acquah, Justice Philip Edward Archer, Justice Edward Kwame Wiredu and Justice Robert John Hayfron-Benjamin(Botswana) 
Supreme Court judges: Justice Koi Larbi, Justice Henry K. Prempeh,  Justice Charles Hayfron-Benjamin and Justice Anselmus Kludze  
Attorney-Generals of Ghana: Edward Nathaniel Moore, Godfred Yeboah Dame

Recent Awards
 Winners of the 2016 edition (and runners up on 4 other occasions) of the National Science and Maths Quiz
 Winners of 2016, 2017, 2018, and 2019 editions of the National Hockey Championship / Citizens International Inter-Schools (CIIS) Hockey fiesta.
 Winners of 2021 National Robotics Championship.

External links

Adisadel College, Cape Coast, Ghana
Adisadel Old Boys Association (AOBA)

References

Cape Coast
Anglican schools in Africa
Educational institutions established in 1910
Christian schools in Ghana
Boarding schools in Ghana
Boys' schools in Ghana
High schools in Ghana
1910 establishments in Gold Coast (British colony)